The Mid Kerry Senior Football Championship is a Gaelic football competition for GAA clubs affiliated to the Mid Kerry Division of Kerry.

Roll of honour

 The 1956 final was abandoned and awarded to Glenbeigh-Glencar.

See also
East Kerry Senior Football Championship
North Kerry Senior Football Championship
West Kerry Senior Football Championship

References

Gaelic football competitions in County Kerry